Route 229 is a Quebec provincial highway located in the Montérégie region. It runs from the junction of Route 112 in Rougement and ends at the junction of Route 132 in Varennes. It overlaps Route 227 in Saint-Jean-Baptiste and Route 116 in Beloeil and Mont-Saint-Hilaire.

Municipalities along Route 229
 Rougemont
 Saint-Jean-Baptiste
 Mont-Saint-Hilaire
 Beloeil
 Sainte-Julie
 Varennes

See also
 List of Quebec provincial highways

References

External links 
 Official Road Network Map of Transports Quebec 
 Route 229 on Google Maps

229